Glens Falls-Saratoga, also known as Schenectady Yankees, Saratoga Harlem Yankees and New York Harlem Yankees was an American professional basketball team based in several New York State locations.  It was a member of the American Basketball League.

In the 1949/1950 season, the team played as the New York Harlem Yankees in New York City. They became the Saratoga Yankees in Saratoga Springs, New York, for the 1950/1951 season and the 1951/1952 season. During the 1951/52 season, the Saratoga Yankees moved to Schenectady, New York, but returned to Saratoga before the end of the season. Finally, during the 1952/1953 season, the team played as Glens Falls-Saratoga. 

The Yankees basketball team folded at the end of the 1951/1952 season.

Year-by-year

Basketball teams in New York (state)